The 2017/18 FIS Ski Jumping Continental Cup was the 27th in a row (25th official) Continental Cup winter season in ski jumping for men and the 14th for ladies. This was also the 16th summer continental cup season for men and 10th for ladies.

After twenty-eight years break, the total 29th edition of the "Beskidy Tour" returned to the ski jumping, first time as part of the Continental Cup. Competition was originally held between 1958 and 1989 as FIS Race event. A total of three competitions at three different hills in two countries took place from 18–20 August 2017. Competition was held in Szczyrk, Wisła and Frenštát pod Radhoštěm. Overall winner became Klemens Murańka from Poland.

Other competitive circuits this season included the World Cup, Grand Prix, FIS Cup, FIS Race and Alpen Cup.

Map of continental cup hosts 

All 23 locations hosting continental cup events in summer (8 for men / 2 for ladies) and in winter (14 for men / 3 for ladies) this season.

 Men
 Ladies
 Men & Ladies

Men

Summer

Winter

Ladies

Summer

Winter

Men's standings

Summer

Winter

Beskidy Tour

Ladies' standings

Summer

Winter

Participants 
Overall, total of 22 countries for both men and ladies participated in this season:

Europa Cup vs. Continental Cup 
Last two seasons of Europa Cup in 1991/92 and 1992/93 are recognized as first two Continental Cup seasons by International Ski Federation, although Continental Cup under this name officially started first season in 1993/94 season.

References 

FIS Ski Jumping Continental Cup
2017 in ski jumping
2018 in ski jumping